Tiresia is a 2003 French film directed by Bertrand Bonello and written by Bonello and Luca Fazzi. Based on the legend of Tiresias, it tells of a transgender woman who is kidnapped by a man and left to die in the woods. She is then saved by a family and receives the gift of telling the future. The film stars Laurent Lucas, Clara Choveaux, Thiago Telès, and Célia Catalifo.

Tiresia was nominated for the Palme d'Or at the 2003 Cannes Film Festival.

Cast
 Laurent Lucas as Terranova / Père François
 Clara Choveaux as Tiresia I
 Thiago Telès as Tiresia II
 Célia Catalifo as Anna
 Lou Castel as Charles
 Alex Descas as Marignac
 Fred Ulysse as Roberto
 Stella as Kim
 Marcelo Novais Teles as Eduardo
 Olivier Torres as Mathieu
 Isabelle Ungaro as Louise
 Abel Nataf as Le fils d'Anna
 Pascal Tréguy as Head Animal Trainer

References

Bibliography 
 Bernard Stiegler, "Tirésias et la guerre du temps: Autour d'un film de Bertrand Bonello," De la misère symbolique: Tome 1. L'époque hyperindustrielle (Paris: Galilée, 2004): 163–85.

External links
 
 Interview with Bertrand Bonello July 14, 2005

2003 films
2003 drama films
2000s French-language films
French LGBT-related films
Films directed by Bertrand Bonello
Films with screenplays by Bertrand Bonello
Films about trans women
2003 LGBT-related films
2000s French films